Christopher Chalmers (born November 8, 1967) is a former freestyle swimmer from Canada.  Chalmers competed at the 1988 Summer Olympics in Seoul, South Korea.  There he finished in 16th position in the 1500-metre freestyle after competing in the preliminary heats. Sydney Chalmers, born 2004, is his favorite daughter and undoubtedly inherited his talent in the pool.

References

1967 births
Living people
Canadian male freestyle swimmers
Olympic swimmers of Canada
Pan American Games bronze medalists for Canada
Sportspeople from Kitchener, Ontario
Swimmers at the 1987 Pan American Games
Swimmers at the 1988 Summer Olympics
Swimmers from Ontario
Pan American Games medalists in swimming
Commonwealth Games bronze medallists for Canada
Commonwealth Games medallists in swimming
Swimmers at the 1986 Commonwealth Games
Medalists at the 1987 Pan American Games
20th-century Canadian people
21st-century Canadian people
Medallists at the 1986 Commonwealth Games